Ashkan Mokhtarian (born 18 September 1985 Tehran, Iran), is an Iranian-born Australian mixed martial artist  formerly competing in the Ultimate Fighting Championship.

Background

Mokhtarian's parents fled Iran during the Iran–Iraq War in 1985 and came to Australia as refugees. When Mokhtarian and his younger brother Suman were young, their parents divorced. Ashkan got involved with drugs and alcohol during his teenage years and decided to become a professional MMA fighter after watching the sport on TV.

Ashkan and Suman Mokhtarian are founders of the Australian Top Team located in Wentworthville, NSW although there is no affiliation or association with the American Top Team.

Mixed martial arts career

Early career 
Mokhtarian began training in BJJ and later in kickboxing. He won the Australia Eternal Bantamweight Title in April 2016.

Ultimate Fighting Championship 
Mokhtarian signed with UFC in March 2017.

He made his promotional debut against John Moraga on 11 June 2017 at UFC Fight Night 110. He lost the one-sided fight via unanimous decision.

Mokhtarian faced Ryan Benoit on 19 November 2017 at UFC Fight Night: Werdum vs. Tybura. At the weight-ins, Benoit weight in at 129 pounds, 3 pounds over the flyweight upper limit of 125 pounds. The bout proceeded at a catchweight and Benoit forfeited 20% of his purse to Mokhtarian. He lost the fight via knockout due to a head kick in the third round.

Mokhtarian was scheduled to face Jenel Lausa on 13 June 2018 at UFC Fight Night 132; however, he pulled out of the fight in early May citing injury.

Mokhtarian was expected to face Kai Kara-France on 2 December 2018 at UFC Fight Night 142. However, Mokhtarian pulled out of the fight on 20 November citing injury.

On May 28, 2019 it was reported that  Mokhtarian was released by UFC.

Mixed martial arts record

|-
|Loss
|align=center|13–4
|Shunichi Shimizu
|Decision (unanimous)
|Hex Fight Series 19
|
|align=center| 3
|align=center| 5:00
|Melbourne, Australia
| 
|-
|Loss
|align=center|13–3
|Ryan Benoit
|KO (head kick)
|UFC Fight Night: Werdum vs. Tybura
|
|align=center|3
|align=center|2:38
|Sydney, Australia
|
|-
|Loss
|align=center|13–2
|John Moraga
|Decision (unanimous)
|UFC Fight Night: Lewis vs. Hunt
|
|align=center|3
|align=center|5:00
|Auckland, New Zealand
|
|-
|Win
|align=center|13–1
|Kan Hamongkol
|KO (head kick)
|JNI Promotions: 1 on 1
|
|align=center|1
|align=center|0:27
|Sydney, Australia
|
|-
|Win
|align=center|12–1
|Shannon McClellan
|Decision (unanimous)
|Eternal MMA 16
|
|align=center| 3
|align=center| 5:00
|Gold Coast, Australia
|
|-
|Win
|align=center|11–1
|Muhammad Hanif bin Zainal
|TKO (punches)
|Hex Fight Series 5
|
|align=center|2
|align=center|2:36
|Melbourne, Australia
|
|-
|Win
|align=center|10–1
|Josh Karst
|KO (punches)
|Wollongong Wars 3
|
|align=center|1
|align=center|3:18
|Wollongong, Australia
|
|-
|Win
|align=center|9–1
|Honggang Yao
|Submission (heel hook)
|Rebel FC 3: The Promised Ones
|
|align=center|2
|align=center|3:00 
|Shandong, China
|
|-
|Win
|align=center|8–1
|Jaikom Paitoon
|Submission (rear-naked choke)
|JNI Promotions: Mokhtarian vs. Paitoon
|
|align=center|1
|align=center|3:16
|Sydney, Australia
|
|-
| Loss
| align=center| 7–1
| Edwin Arana
| Submission (rear-naked choke)
| Nitro MMA 12
| 
| align=center| 2
| align=center| 3:33
| Logan City, Australia
|
|-
| Win
| align=center| 7–0
| Sebastian Taylor
| TKO (punches)
| Gladiators Cage Fighting 4
| 
| align=center| 2
| align=center| 0:56
| Sydney, Australia
| 
|-
| Win
| align=center| 6–0
| Nick Browning
| TKO (punches)
| JNI Promotions: Proceed With Caution
| 
| align=center| 1
| align=center| 4:56
| Sydney, Australia
|
|-
| Win
| align=center| 5–0
| Ali Mohammad Reza
| TKO (punches)
| JNI Promotions: Straight Up
| 
| align=center| 2
| align=center| 2:36
| Sydney, Australia
|
|-
| Win
| align=center| 4–0
| Hakar Magid
| Submission (rear-naked choke)
| JNI Promotions: Lockdown
| 
| align=center| 1
| align=center| 4:38
| Sydney, Australia
| 
|-
| Win
| align=center| 3–0
| Shawn Sutton
| Submission (guillotine choke)
| War in the West 2
| 
| align=center| 2
| align=center| 3:24
| Sydney, Australia
|
|-
| Win
| align=center| 2–0
| Manopnoi Singmanasak
| Submission (guillotine Cchoke)
| JNI Promotions: Persons of Interest
| 
| align=center| 1
| align=center| 0:29
| Sydney, Australia
|
|-
| Win
| align=center| 1–0
| Craig Lankester
| Submission (rear-naked choke)
| 6RAR: Fight for the Troops
| 
| align=center| 1
| align=center| 3:42
| Brisbane, Australia
|

See also
 List of current UFC fighters
 List of male mixed martial artists

References

External links
 
 

1985 births
Living people
Sportspeople from Sydney
Sportsmen from New South Wales
Australian male mixed martial artists
Iranian male mixed martial artists
Iranian emigrants to Australia
Flyweight mixed martial artists
Bantamweight mixed martial artists
Mixed martial artists utilizing kickboxing
Mixed martial artists utilizing Brazilian jiu-jitsu
Australian practitioners of Brazilian jiu-jitsu
Iranian practitioners of Brazilian jiu-jitsu
Sportspeople of Iranian descent
Ultimate Fighting Championship male fighters